Tshimbulu is a town in Kasaï-Central, Democratic Republic of the Congo.

References

Populated places in Kasaï-Central